A director of credit and collections is a senior-level employee in an organization's credit department. Job responsibilities may include:
 Overseeing credit and collection functions
 Hiring, firing, evaluating and promoting credit department employees
 Administrating credit policies
 Evaluating and improving collection effectiveness
 Encouraging sales growth
 Mentoring credit managers, credit analysts and other credit department personnel

Education and background 
Employees holding the director of credit and collections position typically have a bachelor's degree or higher, 15–20 years of credit experience, global experience and a Certified Credit Executive designation from the National Association of Credit Management (NACM).

Employment 
As of June 2016, the median salary for a director of credit and collections is $105,282. They typical salary is between $90,419 and $125,160.

Professional organizations 
Credit analysts in the United States can obtain memberships, continuing education and certification through NACM. Certification levels include Credit Business Associate, Certified Credit and Risk Analyst, Credit Business Fellow, Certified Credit Executive, Certified International Credit Professional and International Certified Credit Executive.

See also 
 Credit assistant
 Credit analyst
 Credit manager

References 

Credit management
Finance occupations